Zoe Băicoianu (15 August 1910 – 8 March 1987) was a Romanian sculptor and ceramist.

Life
Băicoianu was born in Predeal and she studied with André Lhote in Paris in 1937.  She also attended the École des Beaux-Arts in Paris and the Romanian Academy in Rome. She was a multidisciplinary artist devoted to fashion and art object (worked metal, glass and wood). 

Băicoianu was a professor at the Bucharest National University of Arts. She created the 1953 stone statue of Ion Luca Caragiale which stands in Herăstrău Park. She died in Bucharest in 1987.

References

1910 births
1987 deaths
People from Predeal
Romanian ceramists
Romanian women academics
20th-century Romanian sculptors
Romanian women ceramists
Romanian women sculptors
20th-century Romanian women artists
20th-century ceramists
Academic staff of the Bucharest National University of Arts